Lucas Blondel (born 14 September 1996) is an Argentine professional footballer who plays as a right-back for Argentine Primera División side Tigre.

Club career

Atlético Rafaela
Born in Buenos Aires, Blondel joined Atlético de Rafaela's youth setup at the age of seven. He made his first team debut for the club on 2 June 2016, coming on as a late substitute for Nelson Benítez in a 2–2 Copa Argentina draw against Ferro Carril Oeste (3–2 win on penalties). His Primera División occurred on 30 April of the following year, replacing Ángelo Martino in a 2–1 away win over Olimpo; he featured in a further six league matches during the campaign, as his side suffered relegation.

Blondel scored his first professional goal on 18 February 2018, netting his team's second in a 2–0 Primera B Nacional away win over Ferro Carril Oeste.

Tigre
On 18 February 2021, Blondel joined Tigre on a three-year deal, as the club paid a rumoured fee of US$ 300,000 for 70% of his economic rights. He made his debut for the club on 20 February, replacing Cristian Zabala in a 1–1 home draw (5–3 penalty win) against Alvarado also for the national cup.

An immediate starter, Blondel contributed with three goals in 28 league appearances during the 2021 campaign, as Tigre returned to the top tier. He scored his first goal in the category on 11 February 2022, netting the opener in a 1–1 away draw against Godoy Cruz.

Career statistics
.

References

External links
 

1996 births
Living people
Footballers from Buenos Aires
Argentine footballers
Association football defenders
Argentine Primera División players
Primera Nacional players
Atlético de Rafaela footballers
Club Atlético Tigre footballers
Argentine people of French descent